Carlos Tello (28 March 1929 – 8 May 1965) was a Chilean footballer. He played in 14 matches for the Chile national football team from 1952 to 1957. He was also part of Chile's squad for the 1957 South American Championship.

References

External links
 
 

1929 births
1965 deaths
Chilean footballers
Chile international footballers
Place of birth missing
Association football forwards
Audax Italiano footballers